Ruan André Olivier (born 5 July 1994) is a South African professional squash player. He achieved his highest career PSA singles ranking of 223 in December 2017.

References

External links 

 Profile at PSA
 

1994 births
Living people
South African male squash players
Sportspeople from Bloemfontein
University of Johannesburg alumni
21st-century South African people